Jhon Jader Durán Palacio (born 13 December 2003) is a Colombian footballer who currently plays as a winger for Premier League club Aston Villa and the Colombia national team.

Club career
Durán played for Envigado F.C. from 2019 to 2021.

In October 2020, Durán was included in The Guardian's "60 of the best young talents in world football" list.

Sebastian Pelzer, the technical director of Chicago Fire, spotted Duran while watching another player at his former club Envigado and quickly sanctioned a £1.5m move. He was convinced the club would make a big profit on the youngster.

In January 2021, Chicago Fire acquired Durán on a contract beginning on 1 January 2022.

Durán made his Chicago Fire debut on 26 February 2022 against Inter Miami CF. He scored his first goal for the club on 14 May 2022 against FC Cincinnati.

Aston Villa
On 16 January 2023, Premier League club Aston Villa announced that they had agreed a deal to sign Durán, subject to a medical, personal terms being agreed and a work visa being attained. Durán left the Colombian camp for the 2023 South American U-20 Championship to fly to England to complete these. Durán completed his transfer on 23 January. The transfer fee was reported to be £14.75m, with the potential of an extra £3.3m of add-ons.

On 4 February 2023, Durán made his Premier League debut as a late substitute in a 4–2 defeat to Leicester City.

International career
Durán represented the Colombia national under-17 team at the 2019 South American U-17 Championship. He made his international debut for Colombia's senior team against Guatemala on 24 September 2022, replacing Radamel Falcao as a halftime substitute.

Career statistics

Club

References

External links
 Profile at the Aston Villa F.C. website

2003 births
Living people
Colombian footballers
Colombian expatriate footballers
Colombian expatriate sportspeople in the United States
Colombia youth international footballers
Colombia international footballers
Association football forwards
Categoría Primera A players
Chicago Fire FC players
Envigado F.C. players
Expatriate soccer players in the United States
Footballers from Medellín
Major League Soccer players
MLS Next Pro players
Chicago Fire FC II players
Aston Villa F.C. players
Expatriate footballers in England
Colombian expatriate sportspeople in England
Premier League players